Amorbia chiapas is a species of moth of the family Tortricidae. It is found in Mexico in the states of Chiapas, Oaxaca and Veracruz, where it is found at altitudes between 1,700 and 2,300 meters.

The length of the forewings is 11.2–11.6 mm for males and 12.7–13.1 mm for females. The ground colour of the forewings is brown. The hindwings are beige with darker scales scattered over the anal area.

Etymology
The species name refers to the Mexican state of Chiapas.

References

Moths described in 2007
Sparganothini
Moths of Central America